The 1963 Illinois Fighting Illini football team was an American football team that represented the University of Illinois during the 1963 Big Ten Conference football season. In their fourth year under head coach Pete Elliott, the Illini compiled an 8–1–1 record, finished in first place in the Big Ten Conference, were ranked #3 in the final AP Poll, and defeated Washington in the 1964 Rose Bowl. The sole loss was a 14-8 defeat against Michigan.

Illinois center/linebacker Dick Butkus was selected as the team's most valuable player, won the 1963 Chicago Tribune Silver Football trophy as the Big Ten's most valuable player, and was honored as a unanimous first-team player on the 1963 College Football All-America Team. Tackle Archie Sutton was selected by the Newspaper Enterprise Association as a second-team All-American.

Quarterback Mike Taliaferro led the team with 450 passing yards while Jim Grabowski led the team with 616 rushing yards. Gregg Schumacher led the team with 133 receiving yards.

Schedule

Players
 Dick Butkus - center/linebacker
 Jim Grabowski - running back
 Sammy Price - running back
 Gregg Schumacher - end
 Archie Sutton - tackle
 Mike Taliaferro - quarterback

Awards and honors
 Dick Butkus (Linebacker)
Chicago Tribune Silver Football
Consensus First-Team All-American (linebacker)
All-American (center)
Archie Sutton (Tackle)
All-American (tackle)

Roster

Head Coach: Pete Elliott (3rd year at Illinois)

References

Illinois
Illinois Fighting Illini football seasons
Rose Bowl champion seasons
Big Ten Conference football champion seasons
Illinois Fighting Illini football